Konstantin Friedrich Flemig (born 1988) is a German director of documentary films.

Biography
Flemig was born near Stuttgart, Germany. He started filmmaking as a teenager, creating stunt videos and mockumenatries in the style of MTV Jackass. For his application for film school, he travelled to Congo to make a film about a luxury restaurant.

He attended the German School of Journalism before studying documentary filmmaking and screenwriting at the renowned Film Academy Baden-Württemberg. For his film BilderKrieg - Picturing War he won the Hollywood International Independent Documentary Award as well as the Special Mention Award at the International Open Film Festival. The documentary about a young German war photographer was produced by German television SWR and was screened at multiple international film festivals.

For his short documentary Exit Exit Exit, he took a course offered by the German Army for war correspondents. He is one of Werner Herzog's rogues, a group of young filmmakers who attended his Rogue Film School seminar. The curriculum consists of topics like " the art of lockpicking", "the creation of your own shooting permits" and "Guerrilla tactics".

After publicly criticizing the Turkish invasion of Syrian Afrin in 2018, Flemig received several death threats.

Since the summer of 2022, Flemig has been on camera for the German YouTube channel CRISIS - Hinter der Front operated by Funk as a war reporter from the crisis areas of Ukraine, South Ossetia, Syria and Afghanistan, among others.

Filmography 
Documentaries
Kinshasa à la carte (2010) (short film)
Exit, Exit, Exit - War reporters in training (2012)
Irtidad (2013)
Picturing War (2016)

Awards 
 Hollywood International Independent Documentary Award for Picturing War
 Special Mention Award of the International Open Film Festival for Picturing War
 Jury Prize of the Baghdad International Film Festival for Picturing War

References

External links 
 Homepage Konstantin Flemig
 Interview with Flemig for Zebrabutter (German)
 

1988 births
Living people
Film people from Stuttgart
German documentary film directors
German reporters and correspondents
German war correspondents
War correspondents of the Syrian civil war
War correspondents of the Russo-Ukrainian War